This article is a list of current National Football League (NFL) stadiums, their locations, capacities, their first year of usage, and home teams. Although the NFL has 32 teams, there are only 30 full-time NFL stadiums. This is because the New York Giants and New York Jets share MetLife Stadium, while the Los Angeles Rams and the Los Angeles Chargers share SoFi Stadium.

The newest full-time NFL stadiums are SoFi Stadium in Inglewood, California, home of both the Los Angeles Rams and the Los Angeles Chargers; and Allegiant Stadium in Las Vegas, Nevada, home of the Las Vegas Raiders. Both stadiums opened for the 2020 season. Soldier Field in Chicago is the oldest, having opened in 1924; however, the Bears did not play at Soldier Field until 1971 and did not play there in 2002 while the stadium was under reconstruction, and thus the oldest continuously used stadium in the NFL is Lambeau Field, hosting the Green Bay Packers since its opening in 1957.

The NFL uses several other stadiums on a regular basis in addition to the teams' designated regular home sites. In England, two London venues – Wembley Stadium and from 2016 to 2018 the Twickehnam Stadium then the Tottenham Hotspur Stadium – are contracted to host a combined four games per season, as part of the NFL International Series which runs through 2022. Estadio Azteca in Mexico City hosted NFL International Series games in 2016, 2017, and 2019, and was under contract to host one game per season through 2021. In addition, Tom Benson Hall of Fame Stadium in Canton, Ohio, is the location of the annual exhibition Pro Football Hall of Fame Game. From 2022 also the Allianz Arena in Germany will host the Munich Game of the NFL International series.

The majority of current NFL stadiums have sold naming rights to corporations. Only two of the league's 30 stadiums – Lambeau Field and Soldier Field – do not currently use a corporate-sponsored name.

Stadium characteristics
 
Stadiums represent a considerable expense to a community, and thus their construction, use, and funding often enter the public discourse. Also, given the perceived advantage a team gets to playing in its home stadium, particular attention is given in the media to the peculiarities of each stadium's environment. Climate, playing surface (either natural or artificial turf), and the type of roof all contribute to giving each team its home-field advantage.

Stadiums are either open, enclosed, or have a retractable roof. For retractable roofs, the home team determines if the roof is to be opened or closed 90 minutes before kickoff.

Seating
With a peak capacity of over 100,000 spectators, AT&T Stadium has the highest capacity of any NFL stadium, while MetLife Stadium has the highest listed seating capacity at 82,500. The smallest stadium is Soldier Field with a capacity of 61,500.

In their normal configurations, all of the league's 30 stadiums have a seating capacity of at least 60,000 spectators; of those, a majority (17) have fewer than 70,000 seats, while eight have between 70,000 and 80,000 and five can seat 80,000 or more. In contrast to college football stadiums, the largest of which can and regularly do accommodate over 100,000 spectators, no stadium in the league currently has a listed seating capacity of more than 82,500. Teams rarely build their stadiums far beyond the 80,000 seat threshold (and even then, only in the largest markets) because of the league's blackout policy, which prohibited the televising of any NFL game within 75 miles of its home market if a game does not sell all of its non-premium seating. The policy has been suspended since 2015; from then until 2019, several teams were playing in temporary facilities with capacities far larger than a normal stadium, and in 2020, social distancing mandates prohibited teams from selling out their stadiums. In the opposite direction, the league has a firm minimum on the number of seats an NFL stadium should have; since 1971, the league has generally not allowed any stadium under 50,000 seats to host a full-time NFL team. In normal circumstances, all NFL stadiums are all-seaters.

List of current stadiums
Some stadiums can be expanded to fit larger crowds for other events such as concerts or conventions. Official seating capacities do not include standing room.

Map of current stadiums

Additional stadiums

Future stadiums

See also
 Chronology of home stadiums for current National Football League teams
 National Football League
 Stadiums to host the Super Bowl (including future years)
 List of NCAA Division I FBS football stadiums
 List of NCAA Division I FCS football stadiums
 List of American football stadiums by capacity
 List of U.S. stadiums by capacity
 List of North American stadiums by capacity
 List of Canadian Football League stadiums
 List of current Major League Baseball stadiums
 List of Major League Soccer stadiums
 List of Major League Lacrosse stadiums
 List of National Basketball Association arenas
 List of National Hockey League arenas

Notes

References

External links
 Map of NFL Stadiums
 Aerial Views of NFL Stadiums
 Stadiums of Pro Football
 NFL Map
 Ranking the NFL Stadiums - Yahoo! Sports
 NFL stadiums on Ballparks.com
 Best NFL stadiums
 Power Ranking NFL Stadiums, 2014 Edition - Yard Barker

Football
National Football League stadiums